Willians dos Santos Santana (born 22 May 1988), simply known as Willians Santana, is a Brazilian footballer who plays as an attacking midfielder for Confiança. He also plays as a forward.

Honours
Vitória
Campeonato Baiano: 2007, 2008

Fluminense
Campeonato Brasileiro Série A: 2010

Bahia
Campeonato Baiano: 2015

References

External links

1988 births
Living people
People from Aracaju
Brazilian footballers
Association football forwards
Campeonato Brasileiro Série A players
Campeonato Brasileiro Série B players
Esporte Clube Vitória players
Sociedade Esportiva Palmeiras players
Fluminense FC players
Desportivo Brasil players
Sport Club do Recife players
América Futebol Clube (MG) players
Atlético Clube Goianiense players
Avaí FC players
J1 League players
J2 League players
Qatar Stars League players
Matsumoto Yamaga FC players
Al-Khor SC players
Clube de Regatas Brasil players
Brazilian expatriate footballers
Brazilian expatriate sportspeople in Japan
Expatriate footballers in Japan
Brazilian expatriate sportspeople in Qatar
Expatriate footballers in Qatar
Sportspeople from Sergipe